Liliana Gonzalias (born 14 December 1932) is an Argentine swimmer who competed at the 1948 Summer Olympics and won three medals at the 1955 Pan American Games.

References

Swimmers at the 1948 Summer Olympics
Olympic swimmers of Argentina
Argentine female swimmers
Swimmers at the 1955 Pan American Games
Pan American Games silver medalists for Argentina
Pan American Games bronze medalists for Argentina
Argentine female freestyle swimmers
Female backstroke swimmers
Pan American Games medalists in swimming
Living people
1932 births
Medalists at the 1955 Pan American Games
People from Adrogué
Sportspeople from Buenos Aires Province
20th-century Argentine women